Jackson Brewing Company may refer to:

Companies
Jackson Brewing Company (New Orleans), former brewing company in New Orleans 
Jackson Brewing Company (San Francisco), former brewing company in San Francisco

See also
Jax Brewing Company, Jacksonville, Florida